Bishigram (بیشیگرام) valley is located in Swat District of Khyber Pakhtunkhwa.

The valley is home to the last native-speakers of the near-extinct Badeshi language.

References

Populated places in Swat District
Swat District
Swat Kohistan
Tourist attractions in Swat